Kevin John Anderson is an Australian politician. Anderson is the New South Wales Minister for Lands and Water and the Minister for Hospitality and Racing in the Perrottet ministry since December 2021. Anderson is also a member of the New South Wales Legislative Assembly representing Tamworth for the Nationals since 26 March 2011.

Anderson had previously served as the Minister for Better Regulation and Innovation in the second Berejiklian and Perrottet ministries between April 2019 and December 2021.

Early years and background
Anderson moved to Tamworth, aged 30 years. He spent eleven years as a journalist and news reader with the local Prime Television station. He left Prime in 2004 to work with Hunter New England Area Health Service as a communications and business development manager. He stood unsuccessfully for the Nationals in Tamworth at the 2007 election.

Anderson was a director of Centreboard Media, a local public relations and marketing consultancy with experience in events such as the Tamworth Country Music Festival. Anderson has been active in community groups in the region, including Westpac Rescue Helicopter, the Salvation Army, the St Nicholas School Board, and Ronald McDonald House in Tamworth. In his spare time Anderson plays rhythm guitar and sings in a local band called Splashpool.

Political career
In a first initiative for the Nationals, Anderson was endorsed following a plebiscite where 4,293 local people voted from a pre-selected field of four candidates. The vote was open to members of the Nationals and the general community, voting at eight polling stations in the electorate, open to anyone on the NSW electoral roll. Anderson defeated James Treloar, the local mayor, on preferences.

At the March 2011 elections, Anderson was elected Member for Tamworth and received a swing of 14.7 points, defeating the sitting independent Peter Draper, winning 57.8 per cent of the vote on a two-party-preferred basis. Following the 2019 state election, Anderson was sworn in as the Minister for Better Regulation and Innovation in the second Berejiklian ministry, with effect from 2 April 2019. Following Berejiklian's resignation as Premier, the election of Dominic Perrottet as Liberal leader, and a subsequent rearrangement of the Perrottet ministry, Anderson was sworn in as Minister for Lands and Water and Minister for Hospitality and Racing on 21 December 2021.

See also 

 Second Berejiklian ministry
 Perrottet ministry

References

External links
 National Party – Kevin Anderson, Candidate for Tamworth
 Kevin Anderson – campaign website
 

Year of birth missing (living people)
Living people
National Party of Australia members of the Parliament of New South Wales
Members of the New South Wales Legislative Assembly
21st-century Australian politicians